Ephemera is transitory written and printed matter.

Ephemera may also refer to:

 Ephemera (mayfly), a genus of mayfly
 Ephemera (band), an all-female Norwegian pop music group
 Ephemera (album), an album by Pepper Adams
"Ephemera", a song by Caligula's Horse from the album Moments from Ephemeral City
 Ephemera (Dungeons & Dragons) a group of creatures in the Dungeons & Dragons fantasy setting

See also
 Plectrohyla ephemera, a species of frog
 Ephemeral (disambiguation)
 Ephemeron, a data structure
 Ephemeris, a publication giving the positions of astronomical objects in the sky